Your Face Sounds Familiar is a Greek reality show airing on ANT1. The fifth season premiered on January 27, 2019. This season marks the first season that the show is filmed and not live.

Cast

Host and judges
Maria Bekatorou returned to host the show for the fifth time and the new four judges are Giorgos Mazonakis, Dimitris Starovas, Alexis Georgoulis and Mimi Denisi.

Contestants
Ten contestants in total competed in the fifth season; five women and five men:

Weekly results

Week 1
The premiere aired on January 27, 2019 and the winner was Argiris with 22 points. Argiris chose to give the money from the audience voting to the organization "Aspres Petaloudes".

After the judges and contestants' scores, Chrispa and Melina were tied with 24 points. Mazonakis, who was the president of the judges for the week, chose to give the final 6 points to Chrispa and the 5 points to Melina. After the combined final scores, three contestants had 13 point. The one who got the highest score from the audience got the highest final place and the one with the lowest got the lowest place.

Week 2
The second episode aired on February 3, 2019 and the winner Katerina with 22 points. Katerina chose to give the money from the audience voting to the organization "Faros Zois".

After the judges and contestants' scores, Eleni and Eva were tied with 30 points. Denisi, who was the president of the judges for the week, chose to give the final 7 points to Eleni and the 6 points to Eva. After the combined final scores, two contestants had 16 points and other two contestants had 15 points. The one who got the highest score from the audience got the highest final place and the one with the lowest got the lowest place.

Notes
 1.  The points that judges gave in order (Georgoulis, Mazonakis, Denisi, Starovas).
 2.  Each contestant gave 5 points to a contestant of their choice.
 3.  Total of both extra and judges' score.
 4.  Result of both extra and judges' score.
 5.  In the final, only the audience voted for the winner and the one with the most votes won the competition.

Week 3
The third episode aired on February 10, 2019 and the winner was Eva with 23 points. Eva chose to give the money from the audience voting to the organization "Save Animal Greece".

After the combined final scores, two contestants had 19 points and other two contestants had 10 points. The one who got the highest score from the audience got the highest final place and the one with the lowest got the lowest place.

Notes
 1.  The points that judges gave in order (Georgoulis, Mazonakis, Denisi, Starovas).
 2.  Each contestant gave 5 points to a contestant of their choice.
 3.  Total of both extra and judges' score.
 4.  Result of both extra and judges' score.
 5.  In the final, only the audience voted for the winner and the one with the most votes won the competition.

Week 4
The fourth episode aired on February 17, 2019 and the winner was Pashalis with 24 points. Pashalis chose to give the money from the audience voting to the organization "Anadysi".

After the combined final scores, two contestants had 17 points. The one who got the highest score from the audience got the highest final place and the one with the lowest got the lowest place.

Notes
 1.  The points that judges gave in order (Georgoulis, Mazonakis, Denisi, Starovas).
 2.  Each contestant gave 5 points to a contestant of their choice.
 3.  Total of both extra and judges' score.
 4.  Result of both extra and judges' score.
 5.  In the final, only the audience voted for the winner and the one with the most votes won the competition.

Week 5
The fifth episode aired on February 24, 2019 and the winner was Melina with 24 points. Melina chose to give the money from the audience voting to the organization "Save a Greek Stray".

After the judges and contestants' scores, Argiris and Eva were tied with 20 points. Mazonakis, who was the president of the judges for the week, chose to give the final 5 points to Argiris and the 4 points to Eva.

Notes
 1.  The points that judges gave in order (Georgoulis, Mazonakis, Denisi, Starovas).
 2.  Each contestant gave 5 points to a contestant of their choice.
 3.  Total of both extra and judges' score.
 4.  Result of both extra and judges' score.
 5.  In the final, only the audience voted for the winner and the one with the most votes won the competition.

Week 6
The sixth episode aired on March 3, 2019 and the winner was Ian with 24 points. Ian chose to give the money from the audience voting to the organization "Skytali".

After the judges and contestants' scores, Argiris and Melina were tied with 20 points. Denisi, who was the president of the judges for the week, chose to give the final 10 points to Melina and the 9 points to Argiris. After the combined final scores, two contestants had 19 points. The one who got the highest score from the audience got the highest final place and the one with the lowest got the lowest place.

Notes
 1.  The points that judges gave in order (Georgoulis, Mazonakis, Denisi, Starovas).
 2.  Each contestant gave 5 points to a contestant of their choice.
 3.  Total of both extra and judges' score.
 4.  Result of both extra and judges' score.
 5.  In the final, only the audience voted for the winner and the one with the most votes won the competition.

Week 7
The seventh episode aired on March 10, 2019 and the winner was Ian with 22 points. Ian chose to give the money from the audience voting to the organization "Skytali".

After the judges and contestants' scores, Argiris and Eleni were tied with 20 points. Starovas, who was the president of the judges for the week, chose to give the final 10 points to Eleni and the 9 points to Argiris. After the combined final scores, two contestants had 20 points and other two contestants had 8 points. The one who got the highest score from the audience got the highest final place and the one with the lowest got the lowest place.

Notes
 1.  The points that judges gave in order (Georgoulis, Mazonakis, Denisi, Starovas).
 2.  Each contestant gave 5 points to a contestant of their choice.
 3.  Total of both extra and judges' score.
 4.  Result of both extra and judges' score.
 5.  In the final, only the audience voted for the winner and the one with the most votes won the competition.

Week 8
The eighth episode aired on March 17, 2019 and the winner was Katerina with 23 points. Katerina chose to give the money from the audience voting to the organization "Faros Zois".

After the combined final scores, two contestants had 23 points and other two contestants had 16 points. The one who got the highest score from the audience got the highest final place and the one with the lowest got the lowest place.

Notes
 1.  The points that judges gave in order (Georgoulis, Mazonakis, Denisi, Starovas).
 2.  Each contestant gave 5 points to a contestant of their choice.
 3.  Total of both extra and judges' score.
 4.  Result of both extra and judges' score.
 5.  In the final, only the audience voted for the winner and the one with the most votes won the competition.

Week 9
The ninth episode aired on March 24, 2019 and the winner was Eythimis with 24 points. Eythimis chose to give the money from the audience voting to the organization "Keepea- Orizontes".

After the judges and contestants' scores, Argiris and Melina were tied with 21 points. Starovas, who was the president of the judges for the week, chose to give the final 6 points to Argiris and the 5 points to Melina. After the combined final scores, two contestants had 10 points. The one who got the highest score from the audience got the highest final place and the one with the lowest got the lowest place.

Betty Maggira was the guest judge of the evening due to Denisi's planned trip.

Notes
 1.  The points that judges gave in order (Georgoulis, Mazonakis, Denisi, Starovas).
 2.  Each contestant gave 5 points to a contestant of their choice.
 3.  Total of both extra and judges' score.
 4.  Result of both extra and judges' score.
 5.  In the final, only the audience voted for the winner and the one with the most votes won the competition.

Week 10
The tenth episode aired on March 31, 2019 and the winner was Pashalis with 23 points. Pashalis chose to give the money from the audience voting to the organization "Anadysi".

After the judges and contestants' scores, Argiris, Chrispa and Katerina were tied with 19 points. Denisi, who was the president of the judges for the week, chose to give the final 5 points to Katerina, the 4 points to Argiris and the 3 points to Chrispa. After the combined final scores, two contestants had 15 points. The one who got the highest score from the audience got the highest final place and the one with the lowest got the lowest place.

Notes
 1.  The points that judges gave in order (Georgoulis, Mazonakis, Denisi, Starovas).
 2.  Each contestant gave 5 points to a contestant of their choice.
 3.  Total of both extra and judges' score.
 4.  Result of both extra and judges' score.
 5.  In the final, only the audience voted for the winner and the one with the most votes won the competition.

Week 11: Eurovision Night
The eleventh episode aired on April 7, 2019 and the winner was Katerina with 23 points. Katerina chose to give the money from the audience voting to the organization "Faros Zois".

After the combined final scores, three contestants had 8 points. The one who got the highest score from the audience got the highest final place and the one with the lowest got the lowest place.

Natalia Germanou was a guest judge of the night

Notes
 1.  The points that judges gave in order (Georgoulis, Mazonakis, Denisi, Starovas).
 2.  Each contestant gave 5 points to a contestant of their choice.
 3.  Total of both extra and judges' score.
 4.  Result of both extra and judges' score.
 5.  In the final, only the audience voted for the winner and the one with the most votes won the competition.

Week 12 
The twelfth episode aired on April 14, 2019 and the winner was Vaggelis with 24 points. Vaggelis chose to give the money from the audience voting to the organization "Karelleio Protipo Kentro Alzheimer".

After the combined final scores, two contestants had 20 points and other two contestants had 16 points. The one who got the highest score from the audience got the highest final place and the one with the lowest got the lowest place.

Eythimis didn't participate to the live due to an accident he had.

Notes
 1.  The points that judges gave in order (Georgoulis, Mazonakis, Denisi, Starovas).
 2.  Each contestant gave 5 points to a contestant of their choice.
 3.  Total of both extra and judges' score.
 4.  Result of both extra and judges' score.
 5.  In the final, only the audience voted for the winner and the one with the most votes won the competition.

Week 13: Semifinals 
The twelfth episode aired on April 21, 2019 and the winner was Eva with 23 points. Evachose to give the money from the audience voting to the organization "Save Animal Greece".

After the combined final scores, two contestants had 11 points. The one who got the highest score from the audience got the highest final place and the one with the lowest got the lowest place.

In the semifinals, the four contestants with the highest cumulative scores from all 12 weeks were announced and were the ones to compete in the finals. The four finalists were; Ian with 238 points, Katerina with 227 points, Argiris with 208 points and Melina with 197 points. It was also the last time the judges were going to score the contestants since the winner is decided only by the audience.

Notes
 1.  The points that judges gave in order (Georgoulis, Mazonakis, Denisi, Starovas).
 2.  Each contestant gave 5 points to a contestant of their choice.
 3.  Total of both extra and judges' score.
 4.  Result of both extra and judges' score.
 5.  In the final, only the audience voted for the winner and the one with the most votes won the competition.

Week 14: Finals
The fourteenth and final live aired on May 5, 2019 and the winner of the show was Ian Stratis. The income from the audience voting for the final, was divided in ten equal parts and was given to all ten foundations that the contestants were representing during the twelve live shows.

At the beginning of the show, Bekatorou performed the songs "Mamma Mia" and "Dancing Queen" by ABBA.

The six contestants who did not compete in the finals, received a special award for their participation on the show. John Tikis, Tony Sfinos, Lefteris Pantazis, Giorgos Mazonakis, Anna Athanasiadi and Eleni Karakasi gave the awards to the contestants. Also, Themis Adamadidis appearedto give the award to one of the finalists.

Notes
 1.  The points that judges gave in order (Georgoulis, Mazonakis, Denisi, Starovas).
 2.  Each contestant gave 5 points to a contestant of their choice.
 3.  Total of both extra and judges' score.
 4.  Result of both extra and judges' score.
 5.  In the final, only the audience voted for the winner and the one with the most votes won the competition.

Results chart

 indicates the contestant came first that week.
 indicates the contestant came last that week.
 indicates the contestant that didn't compete.
 performed but didn't score
 indicates the winning contestant.
 indicates the runner-up contestant.
 indicates the third-place contestant.
 indicates the fourth-place contestant.

Performances

 indicates the contestant came first that week.
 indicates the contestant came last that week.
 indicates the contestant that didn't compete.
 performed but didn't score
 indicates the winning contestant.
 indicates the runner-up contestant.
 indicates the third-place contestant.
 indicates the fourth-place contestant.

Ratings

References

External links
 Official website of Your Face Sounds Familiar
 Facebook page of Your Face Sounds Familiar
 Twitter of Your Face Sounds Familiar

Greek 5
2019 Greek television seasons